Dasteh-ye Rakan Kola may refer to:
 Bala Dasteh-ye Rakan Kola
 Pain Dasteh-ye Rakan Kola